Do Par Barzian (also Romanized as Do Par Barzīān) is a village in Kafsh Kanan Rural District, in the Central District of Bahmai County, Kohgiluyeh and Boyer-Ahmad Province, Iran. At the 2006 census, its population was 36, in 5 families.

References 

Populated places in Bahmai County